David W. Hoyle (born February 4, 1939) is a North Carolina politician who served as a Democratic member of the North Carolina General Assembly representing the state's forty-third Senate district, including constituents in Gaston County.  A real estate developer from Dallas, North Carolina, he is also a former mayor of Dallas and is a graduate of Lenoir-Rhyne College.

Hoyle announced in 2009 that he would retire at the end of the 2009-10 session of the legislature, in what was his ninth term in the state Senate. Shortly before the expiration of his term in 2010, Gov. Beverly Perdue appointed him Secretary of Revenue, a Cabinet post.

References

External links
Official legislative page
News & Observer: "Hoyle is all about business in Senate" (reprinted by Community Reinvestment Association of NC)
Project Vote Smart

Living people
People from Dallas, North Carolina
North Carolina state senators
Mayors of places in North Carolina
State cabinet secretaries of North Carolina
21st-century American politicians
1939 births
Lenoir–Rhyne University alumni